Grandidier Channel is a navigable channel between the west coast of Graham Land, Antarctica, and the north end of the Biscoe Islands, extending from Penola Strait southwestward to the vicinity of Larrouy Island. It was first charted by the French Antarctic Expedition, 1903–05, and named by Jean-Baptiste Charcot for Alfred Grandidier, President of the Paris Geographical Society. Charcot applied the name to the entire body of water between the mainland and the Biscoe Islands but the name has since been restricted to the navigable portion described.

References

Straits of the Biscoe Islands